Ammerschwihr is a commune in the Haut-Rhin department in Grand Est in north-eastern France.

Its inhabitants are called Ammerschwihriens.

Geography
Ammerschwihr is a small town located on the Wine Road of Alsace. Its main economical resources come from wine-growing, in particular its famous vineyard Kaefferkopf, situated on a hill, and one of the Alsace Grand Cru vineyards.

Climate
Ammerschwihr has a oceanic climate (Köppen climate classification Cfb).

Demography

See also
 Communes of the Haut-Rhin department

References

External links
 Alsace Wine Road
  Panoramic photo of Ammerschwihr

Communes of Haut-Rhin